Thomas Vyner may refer to:
 Sir Thomas Vyner, 1st Baronet (1588–1665),  Lord Mayor of London in 1653
 Thomas Vyner (MP) (1666–1707), MP for Great Grimsby 1699–1701
 Thomas Vyner (priest) (died 1673), Canon of Windsor and Dean of Gloucester Cathedral

See also 
 Vyner (disambiguation)